"Merry Gentle Pops" is a song by British humorous group the Barron Knights. It was released as a single in November 1965 and became a top-ten hit in the UK.

Background and release
"Merry Gentle Pops" is a Christmas-themed song and is the third medley by the Barron Knights after "Call Up the Groups" and "Pop Go the Workers". Part one is a medley of the Barron Knights' "Pop Stars Party", "Catch the Wind" by Donovan, "This Little Bird", which had recently been a hit for Marianne Faithful, and "(I Can't Get No) Satisfaction" by the Rolling Stones. Part two is a medley of "Look Through Any Window" by the Hollies, "Tossing and Turning" by the Ivy League, and "Goodbyeee" by Peter Cook and Dudley Moore.

It was released as a single in November 1965 and became the group's third top ten hit, peaking at number nine on the Record Retailer chart. It became their last top-ten hit until their resurgence in 1977 with "Live in Trouble".

Track listing
7": Columbia / DB 7780
 "Merry Gentle Pops" (Part 1) – 3:04
 "Merry Gentle Pops" (Part 2) – 2:11

Charts

References

1965 singles
1965 songs
Columbia Graphophone Company singles